Stachyophyton is a genus of extinct vascular plants known from fossils found in the Posongchong Formation, Wenshan district, Yunnan, China, in deposits of Early Devonian age (Pragian, around ).

References

Early Devonian plants
Prehistoric plant genera